The Center for Development of Human Services (CDHS) was a sponsored nonprofit program of the Research Foundation of the State University of New York located at Buffalo State College. CDHS/ Research Foundation began in 1976 when a small group of Buffalo State College faculty was successful in obtaining a $100,000 social services training grant to provide instruction to those employed in the field of social work. The Social Services Training Project, as it was then called, evolved into CDHS/Research Foundation, now a nationally recognized provider of human services training. CDHS/Research Foundation used to manage over 30 human services training projects representing $50 million in grant-funded activities that serve the residents of New York State and was the largest such provider in the state. From 1999 to 2010, under the leadership of Robert Spaner, Project Director and Principal Investigator, CDHS expanded from a $16 million operation with under 100 staff to a $60 million Center with 400 staff and 40 separate projects. In April, 2010 Mr. Spaner retired. CDHS used to be headquartered in Buffalo, with satellite offices in Rochester, Syracuse, Albany, and New York City. A large number of CDHS staff worked with state and local government agencies statewide.

At of the end of 2018, The Center for Development of Human Services officially ceased all operations when the college's contract with the New York State Office of Children and Family Services expired. CDHS has largely been replaced by the Learning Engagement and Development Services office (LEADS) at SUNY Buffalo State. 

Through research partnerships with faculty and staff of Buffalo State College and the University at Buffalo, local campuses included in the  State University of New York, CDHS/Research Foundation trainers and staff are provided with access to professional expertise and the most current scholarly research in the areas of education and social services. This research is used in curriculum development, training, and technical assistance provided for state and local government agencies, including the New York State Department of Children and Family Services, the New York City Administration for Children’s Services, the New York State Office of Temporary and Disability Assistance, the New York State Department of Health,  and the Erie County Department of Social Services.

Training

Training Units
CDHS includes these training units: 
 The New York State Child Welfare/Child Protective Services Training Institute provides training in the area of child protection, training for mandated reporters in New York State, and training to keep child welfare workers informed regarding the most current legal requirements associated with child protective services, family-centered social work, and issues such as domestic violence, substance abuse, and family reunification.
 The Adolescent Services Training Project provides life skills training for youth aging out of the child welfare system.
 The Foster/Adoptive Parent Training Project offers a variety of courses for foster care providers and those considering adoption, including courses on developmental disabilities and child sexual abuse for foster and adoptive parents.
 The HIV/AIDS Training Institute provides training and educational seminars for caregivers of children living with HIV or AIDS and youth considering being tested.
 The New York State Public Health Insurance Training Institute trains workers who help families obtain free or low-cost health insurance for children as well as those who work in the areas of Medicaid and long-term health care.
 The Management Leadership Institute provides staff professional development training and technical assistance to social services agencies, including the Erie County Department of Social Services and the New York City Human Resources Administration.

As part of its mission of “strengthening human services through training, organizational and technical assistance, technology, and evaluation” CDHS/Research Foundation develops and delivers culturally sensitive, outcome-based training in keeping with the most current adult learning theory and federal mandates, including the Adoption and Safe Families Act (ASFA), the Indian Child Welfare Act (ICWA), and the Multi-Ethnic Placement Act (MEPA), as well as the most current New York State legal requirements. Training is offered in the form of both direct and virtual classroom delivery and also through seminars and conferences facilitated by CDHS/Research Foundation statewide.

External links 
Center for Development of Human Services 
Research Foundation of the State University of New York
Research Foundation of SUNY at Buffalo State College
State University of New York
Buffalo State College 
University at Buffalo
New York State
New York State Office of Children and Family Services
New York State Office of Temporary and Disability Assistance
New York State Department of Health
New York City Administration for Children’s Services
New York City Human Resources Administration
Erie County Department of Social Services

Social work organizations in the United States